"Das Judenthum in der Musik" (German for "Jewishness in Music", but normally translated Judaism in Music; spelled after its first publications, according to modern German spelling practice, as ‘Judentum’) is an essay by Richard Wagner which attacks Jews in general and the composers Giacomo Meyerbeer and Felix Mendelssohn in particular. It was published under a pseudonym in the Neue Zeitschrift für Musik (NZM) of Leipzig in September 1850 and was reissued in a greatly expanded version under Wagner's name in 1869. It is regarded by some as an important landmark in the history of German antisemitism.

The original article of 1850
The first version of the article appeared in the NZM under the pseudonym of K. Freigedank ("K. Freethought"). In an April 1851 letter to Franz Liszt, Wagner gave the excuse that he used a pseudonym "to prevent the question being dragged down by the Jews to a purely personal level".

At the time Wagner was living in exile in Zurich, on the run after his role in the 1849 revolution in Dresden. His article followed a series of essays in the NZM by his disciple Theodor Uhlig, attacking the music of Meyerbeer's opera Le prophète and depicting its composer as a representative of "Hebraic art-taste". Wagner was particularly enraged by the success of Le prophète in Paris, all the more so because he had earlier been an admirer of Meyerbeer, who had given him financial support and used his influence to get Wagner's early opera Rienzi, his first real success, staged in Dresden in 1841.

Wagner was also emboldened by the death of Mendelssohn in 1847, the popularity of whose conservative style he felt was cramping the potential of German music. Although Wagner had shown virtually no sign of anti-Jewish prejudice previously (despite the claims by Rose in his book Wagner, Race and Revolution, and others), he was determined to build on Uhlig's articles and prepare a broadside that would attack his artistic enemies, embedded in what he took to be a populist Judeophobic context.

Wagner claims that the work was written to:
explain to ourselves the involuntary repellence possessed for us by the nature and personality of the Jews, so as to vindicate that instinctive dislike which we plainly recognise as stronger and more overpowering than our conscious zeal to rid ourselves thereof.
Wagner holds that Jews are unable to speak European languages properly and that Jewish speech took the character of an "intolerably jumbled blabber", a "creaking, squeaking, buzzing snuffle", incapable of expressing true passion. This, he says, debars them from any possibility of creating song or music. He also states:
Although the peculiarities of the Jewish mode of speaking and singing come out the most glaringly in the commoner class of Jew, who has remained faithful to his father's stock, and though the cultured son of Jewry takes untold pains to strip them off, nevertheless they shew an impertinent obstinacy in cleaving to him.
There is little novelty in these ideas, which are largely lifted from the theories of language and speech of the French Philosophes of the 18th century. They also follow on from ideas expressed in Wagner's earlier essay The Artwork of the Future, to the effect that those who are outside the Volk (community) are inimical to true Art.

The music produced by composers such as Mendelssohn, whom Wagner damns with faint praise, is "sweet and tinkling without depth". Meyerbeer, who was still alive at the time of publication, is attacked savagely for his music (and for the fact that audiences enjoy it) but without being expressly named.

The essay is riddled with the aggressiveness typical of many Judeophobic publications of the previous few centuries. However Wagner did introduce one striking new image, which was to be taken up after him by many later antisemitic authors:
So long as the separate art of music had a real organic life-need in it […] there was nowhere to be found a Jewish composer... Only when a body’s inner death is manifest, do outside elements win the power of lodgement in it—yet merely to destroy it. Then, indeed, that body’s flesh dissolves into a swarming colony of insect life: but who in looking on that body’s self, would hold it still for living?

Wagner gives some convoluted near-endorsements of the Jewish-born writers Heinrich Heine and Ludwig Börne, stating that the former became a poet only because German culture had become inauthentic. It could thus be represented by a Jew, who understood from his very nature its cultural inauthenticity, but who also excoriated its corruption. In this, he was the "conscience of Judaism", just as Judaism is "the evil conscience of our modern civilisation". Wagner then goes on to refer to Börne, a Jewish writer and journalist who converted to Christianity. He tells Jews to follow his example, recommending that they follow Börne by helping to "redeem" German culture by abandoning Judaism.

Without once looking back, take ye your part in this regenerative work of deliverance through self-annulment; then are we one and un-dissevered! But bethink ye, that only one thing can redeem you from your curse; the redemption of Ahasuerus — Going under!

In the original version of 1850, instead of the word 'self-annulment', Wagner used the words 'the bloody struggle of self-annihilation' - displaying a rather more aggressive approach which was perhaps too blatant for the more widely known figure he had become by 1869, the date of the second version.

Reception of the 1850 article
NZM had a very small circulation—no more, in JM Fischer's estimate, than 1500–2000 readers. Virtually the only response was a letter of complaint to Franz Brendel, the editor of NZM, from Mendelssohn's old colleague Ignaz Moscheles and ten other professors at the Leipzig Conservatory, requesting that Brendel resign from the Conservatory's board. (Brendel had taught music history at the Conservatory since 1846.)  Apart from Moscheles' letter, Fischer has found virtually no other substantial response. The article, which Wagner had hoped would be a sensation, and bring him some money as a journalist, sank like a stone. Nearly all of Wagner's associates, including Liszt, were embarrassed by the article and thought it was a passing phase or a mere fit of pique.

1850–1869
In his major theoretical statement, "Opera and Drama" (1852), Wagner made similar objections to the music of Meyerbeer, while sidestepping the Jewish issue. Although Wagner's personal letters contain occasional jibes about Jews and Judaism, there was no suggestion over future years that he was likely to return to the attack or revive his earlier anonymous article. However, in his notebook for 1868 (known as the 'Brown Book') there appear the ominous words "Consider Judentum." It is not clear what provoked this. Among the contributing factors may be the death of his ‘enemy’ Meyerbeer in 1864, Wagner's own relative security under the patronage of the King of Bavaria, and increase in his personal confidence now that his Ring cycle was under way and he had completed his operas Tristan und Isolde and Die Meistersinger von Nürnberg. An intriguing possibility is that, having received his mother's correspondence (which he subsequently burnt) from his sister in 1868, he discovered that his biological father was the actor and musician Ludwig Geyer, and feared that Geyer was Jewish (which he was not) and that he himself might be Jewish as well. He may therefore also have been influenced by thoughts of his wife Cosima, who was more stridently antisemitic than him.

The 1869 version and after
For reasons which remain unclear, in 1869 Wagner republished the essay with an addendum as long as the original, and under his own name. The first part was reprinted as in 1850, with some references toned down, as in the example already given. With a confidence lacking in the original frenetic effort, the second (new) part seeks to contextualise Wagner's anti-Jewish feelings in the setting of later nineteenth-century German politics, while continuing to snipe at the dead Mendelssohn and Meyerbeer and bringing in other dead musicians, including Schumann, on Wagner's side. He also attacked by name the critic Eduard Hanslick, bringing in reference to the latter's Jewish descent (which Hanslick then attempted to deny).

Once again many of Wagner's supporters were in despair at the provocation. Even Cosima doubted that it was wise. By this time of course Wagner was a well-known figure and the reprint brought many counter-attacks, including: Joseph Engel, "Richard Wagner, Jewishness in Music, a Defense" ("Richard Wagner, das Judentum in Musik, eine Abwehr"); E. M. Oettinger, "An Open Love-Letter to Richard Wagner" ("Offenes Billetdoux an Richard Wagner", Dresden, 1869); and A. Truhart, "Open Letter to Richard Wagner" ("Offener Brief an Richard Wagner" St. Petersburg, 1869).

However the fuss about the reprint was little more than a storm in a teacup. Far more important, in terms of publicising Wagner's anti-Jewish feelings, was his stream of essays and newspaper articles over the following years, up to and including that of his death in 1883, which directly or indirectly criticised Jewish individuals or the Jews as a whole. These coincided with the growth of antisemitism—in the sense of a movement to withdraw the civic rights extended to Jews during the 19th century, and particularly on the unification of Germany in 1870—as a significant force in German and Austrian politics. Antisemitic leaders indeed made approaches to Wagner requesting his support; although he never offered such support officially, neither did he dissociate himself from their policies.

The title in English
The article's first translator into English, W. Ashton Ellis, gave it the title 'Judaism in Music'. This translation has seemed unsatisfactory to some scholars. For example, the writer Barry Millington refers to it as 'Jewishness in Music'; David Conway argues for 'Jewry in Music'.

There are two principal reasons for concern about Ashton's translation of the title. Firstly, 'Judaism' in English carries the meaning of 'the profession or practice of the Jewish religion; the religious system or the polity of the Jews', a topic on which Wagner does not touch. 'Judentum' however in 19th-century Germany carried a much broader meaning—roughly analogous to the nonce English word 'Jewdom' (cf. Christendom) and including the concept of the social practices of the Jews. In particular it carried the pejorative sense of 'haggling' or 'marketeering'—it was used in this sense for example by Karl Marx. Wagner may have wished to refer to this sense, in effect using the word as a pun, as the commercialism implied forms the topic of the essay as a whole. It is therefore important to bear in mind the full range of implications of the title-word 'Judentum' in considering the essay as a whole. 'Jewishness', while not ideal, is perhaps a closer English approximation to 'Judentum' than 'Judaism'.

Wagner and Jews
Notwithstanding his public utterances against Jewish influence in music, and even his utterances against specific Jews, Wagner had numerous Jewish friends and supporters even in his later period. In his autobiography, written between 1865 and 1870, he declared that his acquaintance with the Jew Samuel Lehrs whom he knew in Paris in the early 1840s was ‘one of the most beautiful friendships of my life’. There remain, therefore, elements of the enigmatic, and of the opportunist, in Wagner's personal attitude towards Jews.

The notoriety in Germany of Wagner's animus against Jews is attested to in Theodor Fontane's novel Effi Briest (1895). Effi's husband Baron von Instetten asks her to play Wagner because of "Wagner's stand on the Jewish question".

Recent reception
'Das Judenthum' was an embarrassment to the early Wagnerites and was rarely reprinted in the early 20th century, except as part of his collected works. Fischer has found no significant critical comment on the essay. Before the Nazi period there was just one reprint of the essay itself, in Weimar in 1914. It is therefore very unlikely that it was read by Adolf Hitler or any of the Nazi hierarchy during the development of the Nazi movement (or later) and there is no evidence of this. During the Nazi period there were just two publications: in Berlin in 1934 and in Leipzig in 1939. Neither of these seems to have been a large edition.

'Das Judenthum' is not quoted or mentioned by early writers on Nazism in the 1950s such as Hannah Arendt; the interpretation that he intended murder was never attributed to him before the Nazi policy of physical extermination. Wagner may have meant no more than 'Jews must sacrifice their separate identity for the common good'. Interest in the work seems to have revived in the 1960s with new awareness of the Holocaust following the Eichmann trial. In this context some have suggested that Wagner's  advice for Jews to 'go under' 'like Ahasuerus' was intended as a call for their extermination, as planned by the Nazi regime, but there is no justification for this. In fact the 'Ahasuerus' Wagner may have had in mind was a character from a play (Halle und Jerusalem) by Achim von Arnim, a 'good' Jew who voluntarily sacrifices himself saving other characters from a fire. 

The essay was omitted from the 'complete' edition of Wagner's prose works issued in 1983 on the centenary of his death, because of its perceived link with Nazi antisemitism. A scholarly critical edition, with background material and contemporary comments, was prepared by Jens Malte Fischer in 2000.

Some writers (for example, Bryan Magee) have sought to make a qualified defence of Wagner's originality of thought in 'Das Judenthum', despite acknowledging its malevolence. However, a full consideration of 'Das Judenthum' 's contents weakens this argument. Whether 'Das Judenthum' is to be regarded as a major milestone in German antisemitism remains a subject for debate. Wagner's attitude to the Jews in general was highly equivocal. His later writings, published when he was a well-known and influential figure, frequently contain aggressive anti-Jewish comments, although at the same time he maintained a circle of Jewish-born colleagues and admirers.

Adolf Hitler presented himself as an admirer of Wagner's music, and is said to have claimed that "there is only one legitimate predecessor to National Socialism: Wagner". Wagner's music was frequently played during Nazi rallies (as was the music of Beethoven, also 'appropriated' by the Nazis), and other Nazi events. Germans of the Nazi era, even if they knew nothing about music and nothing of Wagner's writings, were presented with a clear image of Wagner as a great German. Wagner's daughter-in-law, Winifred Wagner, (who never met the composer), was an admirer of Adolf Hitler and ran the Bayreuth Festival of Wagner's music from the death of her husband, Siegfried, in 1930 until the end of World War II, when she was ousted. During the Nazi regime, the Nazi hierarchy was frequently required to attend performances of Wagner operas (although they did not necessarily respond enthusiastically).  

Because of these factors, performances of Wagner's works in the modern state of Israel did not occur during the twentieth century, by consensus. In recent years many Israelis have argued that it is possible to appreciate his musical talents, without implying acceptance of his political or social beliefs. A public performance in Tel Aviv in 2001 of Wagner's prelude to Tristan und Isolde, conducted as an unprogrammed encore by Daniel Barenboim, left its audience partly delighted, partly enraged.

A version of the essay title's translation, Jewry in Music is deliberately used by the music historian David Conway as the title of his history of Jewish musicians in the eighteenth and early nineteenth centuries. Jonas Karlsson has commented "Admittedly  [Conway's book] comes some hundred years too late as a reply to Wagner, yet in its form it may nevertheless be one of the most effective replies imaginable".

References

Sources
Conway, David (2002), "'A Vulture is Almost an Eagle' ... The Jewishness of Richard Wagner", Jewry in Music website, accessed 23 November 2012.
 Conway, David (2012). Jewry in Music: Entry to the Profession from the Enlightenment to Richard Wagner, Cambridge: Cambridge University Press. 
 Deathridge, John (2008). Wagner:Beyond Good and Evil. Berkeley: University of California Press.  
 Dennis, David R. (1996). Beethoven in German Politics, 1870–1989, New Haven and London: Yale University Press.
 Fischer, Jens Malte (2000). Richard Wagners 'Das Judentum in der Musik' . Frankfurt: Insel Verlag .  
 Fontane, Theodor tr. Hugh Rorrison and Helen Chambers, (1995). Effi Briest. London: Penguin.
 Guttman, Robert W. (1990). Richard Wagner: The Man, his Mind and his Music. San Digeo: Hacrourt, Brace, Jovanovich. 
 Karlsson, Jonas (2013). "Profession and Faith", in The Wagner Journal, vol. 7 no. 1. .
 Magee, Bryan (1988). Aspects of Wagner. Oxford: Oxford University Press. 
 Millington, Barry (ed.) (2001) The Wagner Compendium: A Guide to Wagner's Life and Music, revised edition. London: Thames and Hudson Ltd. 
 Rose, Paul Lawrence (1992). Wagner: Race and Revolution. London 1992. 
 Spotts, Frederick (1996). Bayreuth: A History of the Wagner Festival, Yale University Press 
 Wagner, Richard, tr. and ed.  Stewart Spencer and Barry Millington (1978). Selected Letters of Richard Wagner, London: J. M. Dent and Sons. 
 Wagner, Richard, ed. Joachim Bergfeld, tr. George Bird (1980). The Diary of Richard Wagner: The Brown Book 1865–1882. London: Victor Gollancz and Co.. 
 Wagner, Richard, tr. W. Ashton Ellis (1995). Judaism in Music and other Essays. London.  
 Wagner, Richard, ed. D. Borchmeyer (1983). Richard Wagner: Dichtungen und Schriften Jubiläumsaufgabe, 10 vols. Insel Verlag, Frankfurt

External links
 Full text in English (Ellis's translation)
 Das Judenthum in der Musik (1869) – full text 
 Wagner's music in Israel (2001)

1850 essays
1869 essays
Antisemitic publications
Essays by Richard Wagner
1850 in music
Works published under a pseudonym
Works originally published in German magazines